Jagadish "Jags" Krishnan (born 23 April 1972) is an Indian-born Australian politician and general practitioner. He was elected as a Labor member for Riverton in the Western Australian Legislative Assembly at the 2021 state election.

Before politics
Krishnan was born on 23 April 1972 to Krishnan Bellie and Sarasu Krishnan. He was born and grew up in Kotagiri, Tamil Nadu, India, attending Kotagiri Public School, St Antony's Higher Secondary School in Coonoor and Bharathi Matriculation Higher Secondary School in Coimbatore. He then attended JSS Medical College. He lived in the United Kingdom from 2005 to 2006, before moving to Perth, Western Australia. He worked as a general practitioner for four years in Byford before starting a company of his own, Perth GP. His company now has over 20 clinics across Perth.

Politics
Krishnan joined the WA Labor Party one year before the 2021 election.

2021 election campaign
Krishnan was the Labor Party's candidate for the electoral district of Riverton for the 2021 Western Australian state election. Riverton had been held by Mike Nahan from the Liberal party since 2008, but he retired at the 2021 election. Krishnan's main opponent was Anthony Spagnolo. The seat was declared a seat to watch at the election by the Australian Broadcasting Corporation and The West Australian.

Krishnan was criticised during the campaign for handing out a pamphlet claiming that he was a local to the electorate of Riverton, despite living in Mosman Park. He promised to move into the electorate if he won the election. Krishnan was also criticised for how-to-vote cards in the electorate preferencing the No Mandatory Vaccination Party ahead of the Liberal party. Krishnan responded by saying that the preferences on how-to-vote cards are decided by the Labor party and not him personally.

On 13 March 2021, Krishnan won the seat of Riverton with a 13.3% swing towards him.

In December 2022, he became a parliamentary secretary to Sue Ellery, the minister for finance, commerce, and women's interests.

Personal life
Krishnan is married and has two children. He is a Hindu. He is known by the nickname "Dr Jags" within the local community, and used it on election campaign material. He has interests in cricket and soccer. Krishnan is a member of the Leeming Spartan Cricket Club and also coaches a junior soccer team.

References

Living people
Australian Labor Party members of the Parliament of Western Australia
Members of the Western Australian Legislative Assembly
Australian general practitioners
Medical doctors from Tamil Nadu
Indian emigrants to Australia
21st-century Australian politicians
1972 births